Moss Neck is a community in Robeson County, North Carolina, United States.

History 
Moss Neck is located in west-central Robeson County. The name was coined by Native Americans to refer to a stream in the area, and it was later applied to the community after it was settled. It began as a center for turpentine distillation, though as local pine forests were depleted the industry moved south. The community remained due to the presence of a post office and a cooperage. In January 1861, the Wilmington, Charlotte and Rutherford Railroad built a line through the village. A railway station was established, leading to a revitalization of the local community, and it became a center of Lumbee activity. It was frequented by members of the Lowry Gang during the Lowry War. In 1892, the Wilmington and Weldon Railroad proposed building a north-south line through Moss Neck, but at the opposition of a prominent citizen the line was moved a few miles west to Campbell's Mill, which shortly thereafter became Pembroke. By 1909, in addition to the railway station, the community hosted several homes, two turpentine distilleries, a water mill, a sawmill, a hotel, a post office, a school, and a Methodist church. Over the following decades, the community declined as the turpentine industry moved southward and naval stores were supplanted by steel in shipbuilding. The station at Moss Neck was eventually closed, and other business migrated to Pembroke. In the 1920s the Methodist church was disassembled and rebuilt in Pembroke. By 1949, the town was largely deserted.

References

Bibliography 
 
 
 
 

Unincorporated communities in Robeson County, North Carolina
Lumbee